, son of regent Nijō Morotsugu, was a Japanese kugyō (court noble) of the Muromachi period (1336–1573). He held a regent position kampaku from 1409 to 1410. He adopted his brother Nijō Motonori as his son.

References
 

1383 births
1410 deaths
Fujiwara clan
Mitsumoto